Walnut roll may refer to:

 Nut roll
 Poppy seed roll